The Trinidad and Tobago national baseball team is the national baseball team of Trinidad and Tobago. The team is controlled by the Baseball/Softball Association of Trinidad and Tobago, and represents the nation in international competitions. The team is a provisional member of the Pan American Baseball Confederation.

References

This article incorporates GFDL text from the article at Baseball Reference.

National baseball teams
Sport in Trinidad and Tobago
Baseball
Baseball in the Caribbean